Ida Latizia Anna Maria Flynn (born Moretti; February 12, 1942 – April 12, 2004) was an American computer scientist, academic department director, textbook author, and professor. She specialized in operating system, which was the subject of a textbook she co-wrote. Flynn worked at the University of Pittsburgh where she was a founding director of the undergraduate program, Information Sciences (BSIS).

Biography 
She held a bachelor's degree in mathematics from Adelphi University, a master's degree in computer science from Illinois Institute of Technology, a master's degree in business administration from the University of Pittsburgh, and a Ph.D. degree in library and information science from the University of Pittsburgh. 

Flynn was the founder and director of the undergraduate program in information science (BSIS) at the University of Pittsburgh; in memory of her achievements, the Department of Informatics and Networked Systems at the University of Pittsburgh makes an annual award to one of the graduates of the program. She retired in 2000 as professor at the University of Pittsburgh. She also had worked at Point Park College. 

Flynn was the co-author of a textbook on operating systems, "Understanding Operating Systems", of which an early edition received the 2001 Textbook Excellence Award from the Textbook and Academic Authors Association.

References 

American women academics
American computer scientists
Women computer scientists
1942 births
2004 deaths
Adelphi University alumni
Illinois Institute of Technology alumni
University of Pittsburgh alumni
University of Pittsburgh faculty
People from Pittsburgh